German submarine U-627 was a Type VIIC U-boat built for Nazi Germany's Kriegsmarine for service during World War II. Its hull was laid down on 8 August 1941 at the yards of Blohm & Voss in Hamburg and it was commissioned on 18 June 1942 under the command of Kapitänleutnant Robert Kindelbacher.

U-627 was sunk on 27 October 1942 just south of Iceland in position  by depth charges from a British B-17 Flying Fortress bomber from 206 Squadron RAF. This resulted in the loss of all 44 crew members.

Design
German Type VIIC submarines were preceded by the shorter Type VIIB submarines. U-627 had a displacement of  when at the surface and  while submerged. She had two shafts and two  propellers.

U-627 was fitted with five  torpedo tubes (four fitted at the bow and one at the stern), fourteen torpedoes, one  SK C/35 naval gun, 220 rounds, and a  C/30 anti-aircraft gun. The boat had a complement of between forty-four and sixty.

Patrol and loss
U-627 departed Kiel on 15 October 1942 bound for the North Atlantic via the Norwegian coastline and the gap between Iceland and the Faroe Islands. She was at sea for only 13 days before being spotted South by Southwest of Iceland by a B-17 patrol bomber of 206 Squadron RAF - FL457/F, piloted by Pilot Officer R.L. Cowey - and sunk with depth charges, in position  with a loss of all 44 men aboard.

References

Bibliography

 German U-Boat Losses During World War II by Axel Niestle, published by United States Naval Inst (1998), .

External links

German Type VIIC submarines
World War II submarines of Germany
U-boats sunk in 1942
World War II shipwrecks in the Atlantic Ocean
Ships built in Hamburg
U-boats commissioned in 1942
1942 ships
U-boats sunk by British aircraft
U-boats sunk by depth charges
Ships lost with all hands
Maritime incidents in October 1942